Carleton F. Perry (December 1, 1931 - March 6, 2017) was an American politician in the state of Wyoming.

He attended the University of Wyoming.
 
He served in the Wyoming House of Representatives  and Wyoming State Senate as a member of the Republican Party.

He was a rancher.

References

1931 births
2017 deaths
People from Ware, Massachusetts
University of Wyoming alumni
Ranchers from Wyoming
Republican Party Wyoming state senators
Republican Party members of the Wyoming House of Representatives